Henry Hobhouse may refer to:

 Henry Hobhouse (archivist) (1776–1854), English archivist
 Henry Hobhouse (East Somerset MP) (1854–1937), English landowner and Liberal Member of Parliament, 1885–1906
 Henry William Hobhouse (1791–1868), British Member of Parliament for Hereford
 Henry Hobhouse (author) (1924–2016), author of the book Seeds of Change: Five Plants That Transformed Mankind